Vera Elkan (1908–2008) was a South African photographer who is remembered for her images of the International Brigades in the Spanish Civil War.

Biography
Of mixed South African and German parentage, Elkan trained as a photographer in Berlin in the 1930s and worked as a photographer in Germany and South Africa. While based in London, she received funding from the British campaign in support of the International Brigades to go to Spain to photograph the activities of the Brigades. She travelled by ambulance to Alabacete in December 1936 where she photographed German, French and British recruits at the training base. Other images cover international journalists, a Valencia hospital, blood transfusions and air-raid casualties in Madrid. Her images also included shots of Mikhail Koltsov of Pravda, Claud Cockburn of the Daily Worker and of the physician Norman Bethune.

Elkan later worked as a portrait photographer in London but her studio was destroyed in the war, together with the bulk of her work. After the war, she concentrated on family life.

Exhibitions
Vera Elkan's Spanish series has been exhibited at the Imperial War Museum and at the Tate Gallery.

References

External links
Elkan Vera's Spanish images from the Imperial War Museum

South African photographers
1908 births
2008 deaths
South African women photographers
War photographers
Portrait photographers
Photography in Spain
Women photojournalists